Acmaea is a genus of sea snails, specifically true limpets, marine gastropod mollusks in the family Acmaeidae, one of the families of true limpets.

Species
According to the World Register of Marine Species (WoRMS), the following species with accepted names are included within the genus Acmaea :
 Acmaea achates (Reeve, 1855)
 Acmaea juanina Odhner, 1922
 Acmaea mitra Rathke, 1833
 Acmaea nanshaensis Liu, 1991
Taxa inquirenda
 Acmaea cancellata Test, 1945
 Acmaea cornea Test, 1945
 Acmaea fouae Test, 1945
 Acmaea irregularis Test, 1945
 Acmaea transparens Test, 1945
Species brought into synonymy
 Acmaea (Tectura) Gray, 1847 : synonym of  Tectura Gray, 1847 (alternate representation)
 Acmaea (Chiazacmea): synonym of Notoacmea Iredale, 1915
 Acmaea (Collisella) Dall, 1871: synonym of Lottia Gray, 1833
 Acmaea albonotata E. A. Smith, 1901: synonym of Eoacmaea albonotata (E. A. Smith, 1901)
 Acmaea aleutica Dall, 1927: synonym of Erginus apicinus (Dall, 1879)
 Acmaea antillarum (G. B. Sowerby I, 1834): synonym of Lottia antillarum G. B. Sowerby I, 1834
 Acmaea apicina Dall, 1879: synonym of Erginus apicinus (Dall, 1879)
 Acmaea araucana (d'Orbigny, 1839): synonym of Scurria araucana (d'Orbigny, 1839)
 Acmaea bombayana E. A. Smith, 1911: synonym of Cellana radiata radiata (Born, 1778)
 Acmaea cassis Rathke, 1833: synonym of Lottia pelta (Rathke, 1833)
 Acmaea ceciliana (Pilsbry, 1891): synonym of Scurria ceciliana (d'Orbigny, 1841)
 Acmaea chathamensis Pilsbry, 1891: synonym of Cellana rota (Gmelin, 1791)
 Acmaea coffea (Dall, 1909): synonym of Scurria variabilis (G. B. Sowerby I, 1839)
 Acmaea cona Test, 1945: synonym of Lottia cona (Test, 1945)
 Acmaea curvissior Oberling, 1970: synonym of Williamia gussoni (Costa O. G., 1829)
 Acmaea cymbula (Hupé, 1854): synonym of Scurria scurra (Lesson, 1831)
 Acmaea daedala Suter, 1907: synonym of Notoacmea daedala (Suter, 1907)
 Acmaea dalliana Pilsbry, 1891: synonym of Lottia dalliana (Pilsbry, 1891)
 Acmaea dorsuosa Gould, 1859: synonym of Lottia dorsuosa (Gould, 1859)
 Acmaea eccentrica Test, 1945: synonym of Propilidium tasmanicum (Pilsbry, 1895)
 Acmaea edmitchelli Lipps, 1966: synonym of Lottia edmitchelli (Lipps, 1966)
 Acmaea elegans Philippi, 1846: synonym of Lottia antillarum G. B. Sowerby I, 1834
 Acmaea euglypta Dautzenberg & H. Fischer, 1897: synonym of Veleropilina euglypta (Dautzenberg & H. Fischer, 1897)
 Acmaea fergusoni Wheat, 1913: synonym of Testudinalia testudinalis (O. F. Müller, 1776)
 Acmaea garrettii Pilsbry, 1891: synonym of Patelloida garrettii (Pilsbry, 1891)
 Acmaea hamillei P. Fischer, 1857: synonym of Plesiothyreus hamillei (P. Fischer, 1857)
 Acmaea helmsi E. A. Smith, 1894: synonym of Notoacmea elongata (Quoy & Gaimard, 1834)
 Acmaea heroldi Dunker, 1861: synonym of Patelloida heroldi (Dunker, 1861)
 Acmaea inconspicua (Gray, 1843): synonym of Radiacmea inconspicua (Gray, 1843)
 Acmaea insessa (Hinds, 1842): synonym of Lottia insessa (Hinds, 1842)
 Acmaea instabilis (Gould, 1846): synonym of Lottia instabilis (Gould, 1846)
 Acmaea kuragiensis Yokoyama, 1920: synonym of Cryptobranchia kuragiensis (Yokoyama, 1920)
 Acmaea leucophaea (Philippi, 1846): synonym of Scurria variabilis (G. B. Sowerby I, 1839)
 Acmaea leucopleura (Gmelin, 1791): synonym of Lottia leucopleura (Gmelin, 1791)
 Acmaea limatula (Carpenter, 1864): synonym of Lottia limatula (Carpenter, 1864)
 Acmaea maraisi Kilburn, 1977: synonym of Patelloida maraisi (Kilburn, 1977)
 Acmaea mesoleuca Menke, 1851: synonym of Lottia mesoleuca (Menke, 1851)
 Acmaea minutissima E. A. Smith, 1904: synonym of Cocculinella minutissima (E. A. Smith, 1904)
 Acmaea mitchelli Lipps, 1963: synonym of Lottia edmitchelli (Lipps, 1966)
 Acmaea nisoria (Philippi, 1846): synonym of Scurria variabilis (G. B. Sowerby I, 1839)
 Acmaea oblongata Yokoyama, 1926: synonym of Siphonacmea oblongata (Yokoyama, 1926)
 Acmaea ochracea (Dall, 1871): synonym of Lottia instabilis (Gould, 1846)
 Acmaea paleacea (Gould, 1853): synonym of Tectura paleacea (Gould, 1853)
 Acmaea paradigitalis Fritchman, 1960: synonym of Lottia paradigitalis (Fritchman, 1960)
 Acmaea parasitica (Thiem, 1917): synonym of Scurria variabilis (G. B. Sowerby I, 1839)
 Acmaea pelta Rathke, 1833: synonym of Lottia pelta (Rathke, 1833)
 Acmaea persona Rathke, 1833: synonym of Lottia persona (Rathke, 1833)
 Acmaea plana (Pilippi, 1846): synonym of Scurria plana (Philippi, 1846)
 Acmaea profunda (Deshayes): synonym of Eoacmaea profunda (Deshayes, 1863)
 Acmaea pseudocorticata Iredale, 1908: synonym of Patelloida corticata (Hutton, 1880)
 Acmaea puncturata (Lamarck, 1819): synonym of Eoacmaea pustulata (Helbling, 1779)
 Acmaea pustulata (Helbling, 1779): synonym of Eoacmaea pustulata (Helbling, 1779)
 Acmaea radiata Rathke, 1833: synonym of Lottia persona (Rathke, 1833)
 Acmaea rosea Dall, 1872: synonym of Rhodopetala rosea (Dall, 1872) 
 Acmaea rubella: synonym of Erginus rubellus (O. Fabricius, 1780)
 Acmaea saccharina (Linnaeus, 1758): synonym of Patelloida saccharina (Linnaeus, 1758)
 Acmaea scutum Rathke, 1833: synonym of Lottia scutum (Rathke, 1833)
 Acmaea semicornea Preston, 1908: synonym of Trimusculus semicorneus (Preston, 1908)
 Acmaea semirubida Dall, 1914: synonym of Eoacmaea semirubida (Dall, 1914)
 Acmaea striata (Quoy & Gaimard, 1834): synonym of Patelloida striata Quoy & Gaimard, 1834
 Acmaea strigatella Carpenter, 1864: synonym of Lottia strigatella (Carpenter, 1864)
 Acmaea tessulata (O. F. Müller, 1776): synonym of Testudinalia tessulata (O. F. Müller, 1776): synonym of Testudinalia testudinalis (O. F. Müller, 1776)
 Acmaea testudinalis (O. F. Müller, 1776): synonym of Testudinalia testudinalis (O. F. Müller, 1776)
 Acmaea travancorica Preston, 1911: synonym of Cellana radiata (Born, 1778)
 Acmaea unicolor (Forbes, 1844): synonym of Tectura virginea (O. F. Müller, 1776)
 Acmaea variabilis (Pilsbry, 1891): synonym of Scurria variabilis (G. B. Sowerby I, 1839)
 Acmaea virginea (Müller O. F., 1776): synonym of Tectura virginea (O. F. Müller, 1776)
 Acmaea viridula (Pilsbry, 1891): synonym of Scurria viridula (Lamarck, 1822)
 Acmaea wottonae Christiaens, 1975: synonym of Lottia antillarum G. B. Sowerby I, 1834
 Acmaea zografi Dautzenberg & H. Fischer, 1896: synonym of Veleropilina zografi (Dautzenberg & H. Fischer, 1896)

References

 Gofas, S.; Le Renard, J.; Bouchet, P. (2001). Mollusca, in: Costello, M.J. et al. (Ed.) (2001). European register of marine species: a check-list of the marine species in Europe and a bibliography of guides to their identification. Collection Patrimoines Naturels, 50: pp. 180–213

External links

 
Acmaeidae